The 1971–72 season was Colchester United's 30th season in their history and their fourth successive season in the fourth tier of English football, the Fourth Division. Alongside competing in the Fourth Division, the club also participated in the FA Cup and the League Cup, as well as being entered into the pre-season Watney Cup.

Continuing with their cup success of the previous season, Dick Graham's high-scoring side were entered into the Watney Cup, a pre-season tournament held between the two highest scoring teams in each of the four divisions in the Football League who had not achieved promotion or entered European football. Colchester defeated West Bromwich Albion in their first ever penalty shoot-out following a 4–4 draw at The Hawthorns.

Colchester reached the third round of the League Cup, where they were knocked out by Blackpool, and were eliminated from the FA Cup in the first round by Shrewsbury Town. Meanwhile, the U's ended their league campaign in eleventh position, nine points away from promotion.

Season overview
Colchester's goalscoring exploits of the previous campaign enabled qualification for the 1971–72 pre-season Watney Cup competition, open to the two highest scoring teams from each division, exclusively for teams that had not achieved promotion or entered into European competition. Both Luton Town and Carlisle United were beaten at Layer Road ahead of the final, held against West Bromwich Albion at their Hawthorns stadium. The encounter registered four goals apiece, taking the fixture to a penalty shoot-out. Albion missed two penalties, while Colchester youngster Phil Bloss scored the decisive spot kick to win the competition.

Although early favourites for promotion, a club debt of over £21,000 meant that manager Dick Graham needed to inject youth into his ageing side, bringing apprentices Steve Leslie, Steve Foley, Lindsay Smith, Micky Cook and John McLaughlin to name but a few into the first-team picture during the season. All became regulars but youth alone was not sufficient for Colchester to maintain a promotion push as they finished the season in eleventh position, nine points adrift of promotion.

Meanwhile, Colchester experienced a brief run in the League Cup, defeating Brentford and Swindon Town at Layer Road in the first and second rounds respectively, but were heavily beaten at Blackpool in round three. An early exit in the FA Cup followed. After reaching the quarter-final stage last season, the U's were humbled 4–1 at home to Shrewsbury Town in the first round.

Players

Transfers

In

Out

 Total incoming:  ~ £19,500

Loans in

Match details

Fourth Division

Results round by round

League table

Matches

Watney Cup

League Cup

FA Cup

Squad statistics

Appearances and goals

|-
!colspan="14"|Players who appeared for Colchester who left during the season

|}

Goalscorers

Disciplinary record

Clean sheets
Number of games goalkeepers kept a clean sheet.

Player debuts
Players making their first-team Colchester United debut in a fully competitive match.

See also
List of Colchester United F.C. seasons

References

General
Books

Websites

Specific

1971-72
English football clubs 1971–72 season